Saemal Station is a station of the U Line in Shingok-dong, Uijeongbu, Gyeonggi-do, South Korea.

External links

  Station information from Uijeongbu Light Rail Transit Co., Ltd

Seoul Metropolitan Subway stations
Metro stations in Uijeongbu
Railway stations opened in 2012